

Aa

|-
| Aaron's Hill
| Somerset
| 
| 
|-
| Aaron's Hill
| Surrey
| 
| 
|}

Ab

Abb-Abd

|-
| Abbas Combe
| Somerset
| 
| 
|-
| Abberley
| Worcestershire
| 
| 
|-
| Abberton
| Essex
| 
| 
|-
| Abberton
| Worcestershire
| 
| 
|-
| Abbess End
| Essex
| 
| 
|-
| Abbess Roding
| Essex
| 
| 
|-
| Abbey
| Devon
| 
| 
|-
| Abbeycwmhir
| Powys
| 
| 
|-
| Abbeydale
| Gloucestershire
| 
| 
|-
| Abbeydale
| Sheffield
| 
| 
|-
| Abbeydale Park
| Sheffield
| 
| 
|-
| Abbey Dore
| Herefordshire
| 
| 
|-
| Abbey Field
| Essex
| 
| 
|-
| Abbey Gate
| Devon
| 
| 
|-
| Abbey Gate
| Kent
| 
| 
|-
| Abbey Green
| Shropshire
| 
| 
|-
| Abbey Green
| Staffordshire
| 
| 
|-
| Abbey Head
| Dumfries and Galloway
| 
| 
|-
| Abbey Hey
| Manchester
| 
| 
|-
| Abbeyhill
| City of Edinburgh
| 
| 
|-
| Abbeyhill
| Bexley
| 
| 
|-
| Abbey Hulton
| City of Stoke-on-Trent
| 
| 
|-
| Abbey Mead
| Surrey
| 
| 
|-
| Abbey St Bathans
| Scottish Borders
| 
| 
|-
| Abbeystead
| Lancashire
| 
| 
|-
| Abbeytown
| Cumbria
| 
| 
|-
| Abbey Village
| Lancashire
| 
| 
|-
| Abbey Wood
| Greenwich
| 
| 
|-
| Abbey Yard
| Dumfries and Galloway
| 
| 
|-
| Abbots Bickington
| Devon
| 
| 
|-
| Abbots Bromley
| Staffordshire
| 
| 
|-
| Abbotsbury
| Dorset
| 
| 
|-
| Abbotsford
| West Sussex
| 
| 
|-
| Abbotsham
| Devon
| 
| 
|-
| Abbotskerswell
| Devon
| 
| 
|-
| Abbots Langley
| Hertfordshire
| 
| 
|-
| Abbotsleigh
| Devon
| 
| 
|-
| Abbots Leigh
| North Somerset
| 
| 
|-
| Abbotsley
| Cambridgeshire
| 
| 
|-
| Abbot's Meads
| Cheshire West and Chester
| 
| 
|-
| Abbots Morton
| Worcestershire
| 
| 
|-
| Abbots Ripton
| Cambridgeshire
| 
| 
|-
| Abbot's Salford
| Warwickshire
| 
| 
|-
| Abbotstone
| Hampshire
| 
| 
|-
| Abbotswood
| Hampshire
| 
| 
|-
| Abbotswood
| Surrey
| 
| 
|-
| Abbots Worthy
| Hampshire
| 
| 
|-
| Abbotts Ann
| Hampshire
| 
| 
|-
| Abcott
| Shropshire
| 
| 
|-
| Abdon
| Shropshire
| 
| 
|-
| Abdy
| Rotherham
| 
| 
|}

Abe

|-
| Aberaeron
| Ceredigion
| 
| 
|-
| Aberaman
| Rhondda, Cynon, Taff
| 
| 
|-
| Aberangell
| Gwynedd
| 
| 
|-
| Aber-arad
| Carmarthenshire
| 
| 
|-
| Aberarder
| Highland
| 
| 
|-
| Aberargie
| Perth and Kinross
| 
| 
|-
| Aberarth
| Ceredigion
| 
| 
|-
| Aberavon
| Neath Port Talbot
| 
| 
|-
| Aberbanc
| Ceredigion
| 
| 
|-
| Aberbargoed
| Caerphilly
| 
| 
|-
| Aberbechan
| Powys
| 
| 
|-
| Aberbeeg
| Blaenau Gwent
| 
| 
|-
| Aberbran
| Powys
| 
| 
|-
| Abercanaid
| Merthyr Tydfil
| 
| 
|-
| Abercarn
| Caerphilly
| 
| 
|-
| Abercastle
| Pembrokeshire
| 
| 
|-
| Abercegir
| Powys
| 
| 
|-
| Aberchalder
| Highland
| 
| 
|-
| Aberchirder
| Aberdeenshire
| 
| 
|-
| Abercorn
| West Lothian
| 
| 
|-
| Abercraf
| Powys
| 
| 
|-
| Abercregan
| Neath Port Talbot
| 
| 
|-
| Abercrombie
| Fife
| 
| 
|-
| Abercwmboi
| Rhondda, Cynon, Taff
| 
| 
|-
| Abercych
| Pembrokeshire
| 
| 
|-
| Abercynon
| Rhondda, Cynon, Taff
| 
| 
|-
| Aber-Cywarch
| Gwynedd
| 
| 
|-
| Aberdalgie
| Perth and Kinross
| 
| 
|-
| Aberdare (Aberdar)
| Rhondda, Cynon, Taff
| 
| 
|-
| Aberdaron
| Gwynedd
| 
| 
|-
| Aberdaughleddau (Milford Haven)
| Pembrokeshire
| 
| 
|-
| Aberdeen
| City of Aberdeen
| 
| 
|-
| Aberdesach
| Gwynedd
| 
| 
|-
| Aberdour
| Fife
| 
| 
|-
| Aberdulais
| Neath Port Talbot
| 
| 
|-
| Aberdyfi
| Gwynedd
| 
| 
|-
| Aberedw
| Powys
| 
| 
|-
| Abereiddy
| Pembrokeshire
| 
| 
|-
| Abererch
| Gwynedd
| 
| 
|-
| Aberfan
| Merthyr Tydfil
| 
| 
|-
| Aberfeldy
| Perth and Kinross
| 
| 
|-
| Aberffraw
| Isle of Anglesey
| 
| 
|-
| Aberffrwd
| Ceredigion
| 
| 
|-
| Aberffrwd
| Monmouthshire
| 
| 
|-
| Aberford
| Leeds
| 
| 
|-
| Aberfoyle
| Stirling
| 
| 
|-
| Abergarw
| Bridgend
| 
| 
|-
| Abergarwed
| Neath Port Talbot
| 
| 
|-
| Abergavenny (Y Fenni)
| Monmouthshire
| 
| 
|-
| Abergele
| Conwy
| 
| 
|-
| Aber-Giar
| Carmarthenshire
| 
| 
|-
| Abergorlech
| Carmarthenshire
| 
| 
|-
| Abergwaun (Fishguard)
| Pembrokeshire
| 
| 
|-
| Abergwesyn
| Powys
| 
| 
|-
| Abergwili
| Carmarthenshire
| 
| 
|-
| Abergwynfi
| Neath Port Talbot
| 
| 
|-
| Abergwyngregyn
| Gwynedd
| 
| 
|-
| Abergynolwyn
| Gwynedd
| 
| 
|-
| Aberhonddu (Brecon)
| Powys
| 
| 
|-
| Aberhosan
| Powys
| 
| 
|-
| Aberkenfig
| Bridgend
| 
| 
|-
| Aberlady
| East Lothian
| 
| 
|-
| Aberlemno
| Angus
| 
| 
|-
| Aberlerry
| Ceredigion
| 
| 
|-
| Aberllefenni
| Powys
| 
| 
|-
| Abermagwr
| Ceredigion
| 
| 
|-
| Abermorddu
| Flintshire
| 
| 
|-
| Abermule
| Powys
| 
| 
|-
| Abernant
| Carmarthenshire
| 
| 
|-
| Abernant
| Powys
| 
| 
|-
| Abernethy
| Highland
| 
| 
|-
| Abernethy
| Perth and Kinross
| 
| 
|-
| Abernyte
| Perth and Kinross
| 
| 
|-
| Aberoer
| Wrexham
| 
| 
|-
| Aberpennar (Mountain Ash)
| Rhondda, Cynon, Taff
| 
| 
|-
| Aberporth
| Ceredigion
| 
| 
|-
| Abersoch
| Gwynedd
| 
| 
|-
| Abersychan
| Torfaen
| 
| 
|-
| Abertawe (Swansea)
| Swansea
| 
| 
|-
| Aberteifi (Cardigan)
| Ceredigion
| 
| 
|-
| Aberthin
| The Vale Of Glamorgan
| 
| 
|-
| Abertillery (Abertyleri)
| Blaenau Gwent
| 
| 
|-
| Abertridwr
| Caerphilly
| 
| 
|-
| Abertridwr
| Powys
| 
| 
|-
| Abertrinant
| Gwynedd
| 
| 
|-
| Abertyleri (Abertillery)
| Blaenau Gwent
| 
| 
|-
| Abertysswg
| Caerphilly
| 
| 
|-
| Aberuthven
| Perth and Kinross
| 
| 
|-
| Aber Village
| Powys
| 
| 
|-
| Aberyscir
| Powys
| 
| 
|-
| Aberystwyth
| Ceredigion
| 
| 
|}

Abh-Aby

|-
| A' Bhrideanach
|  Highland
| 
| 
|-
| Abingdon
| Oxfordshire
| 
| 
|-
| Abinger Common
| Surrey
| 
| 
|-
| Abinger Hammer
| Surrey
| 
| 
|-
| Abington
| Northamptonshire
| 
| 
|-
| Abington
| South Lanarkshire
| 
| 
|-
| Abington Pigotts
| Cambridgeshire
| 
| 
|-
| Abington Vale
| Northamptonshire
| 
| 
|-
| Abingworth
| West Sussex
| 
| 
|-
| Ab Kettleby
| Leicestershire
| 
| 
|-
| Ab Lench
| Worcestershire
| 
| 
|-
| Ablington
| Wiltshire
| 
| 
|-
| Ablington
| Gloucestershire
| 
| 
|-
| Abney
| Derbyshire
| 
| 
|-
| Aboyne
| Aberdeenshire
| 
| 
|-
| Abraham Heights
| Lancashire
| 
| 
|-
| Abram
| Wigan
| 
| 
|-
| Abriachan
| Highland
| 
| 
|-
| Abridge
| Essex
| 
| 
|-
| Abronhill
| North Lanarkshire
| 
| 
|-
| Abshot
| Hampshire
| 
| 
|-
| Abson
| South Gloucestershire
| 
| 
|-
| Abthorpe
| Northamptonshire
| 
| 
|-
| Abune-the-hill
| Orkney Islands
| 
| 
|-
| Aby
| Lincolnshire
| 
| 
|}

Ac

Aca-Ach

|-
| Acarsaid
| Highland
| 
| 
|-
| Acaster Malbis
| York
| 
| 
|-
| Acaster Selby
| North Yorkshire
| 
| 
|-
| Accrington
| Lancashire
| 
| 
|-
| Acha
| Argyll and Bute
| 
| 
|-
| Achachork
| Highland
| 
| 
|-
| Achahoish
| Argyll and Bute
| 
| 
|-
| Achaleven
| Argyll and Bute
| 
| 
|-
| Achalone
| Highland
| 
| 
|-
| Acha Mor (Lewis)
| Western Isles
| 
| 
|-
| Achanamara
| Argyll and Bute
| 
| 
|-
| Achanelid
| Argyll and Bute
| 
| 
|-
| Ach'an Todhair
| Highland
| 
| 
|-
| Achaphubuil
| Highland
| 
| 
|-
| Acharacle
| Highland
| 
| 
|-
| Achargary
| Highland
| 
| 
|-
| Acharn
| Angus
| 
| 
|-
| Acharn
| Perth and Kinross
| 
| 
|-
| Achavandra Muir
| Highland
| 
| 
|-
| Achddu
| Carmarthenshire
| 
| 
|-
| Achfary
| Highland
| 
| 
|-
| Achfrish
| Highland
| 
| 
|-
| Achgarve
| Highland
| 
| 
|-
| Achiemore
| Highland
| 
| 
|-
| A' Chill
| Highland
| 
| 
|-
| Achiltibuie
| Highland
| 
| 
|-
| Achina
| Highland
| 
| 
|-
| Achinahuagh
| Highland
| 
| 
|-
| Achindarroch
| Highland
| 
| 
|-
| Achininver
| Highland
| 
| 
|-
| Achintee
| Highland
| 
| 
|-
| Achintraid
| Highland
| 
| 
|-
| Achleck
| Argyll and Bute
| 
| 
|-
| Achluachrach
| Highland
| 
| 
|-
| Achlyness
| Highland
| 
| 
|-
| Achmelvich
| Highland
| 
| 
|-
| Achmore (near Ullapool)
| Highland
| 
| 
|-
| Achmore (near Loch Carron)
| Highland
| 
| 
|-
| Achnacarnin
| Highland
| 
| 
|-
| Achnacarry
| Highland
| 
| 
|-
| Achnacloich
| Highland
| 
| 
|-
| Achnacroish
| Argyll and Bute
| 
| 
|-
| Achnaha
| Highland
| 
| 
|-
| Achnahanat
| Highland
| 
| 
|-
| Achnahannet
| Highland
| 
| 
|-
| Achnahard
| Argyll and Bute
| 
| 
|-
| Achnairn
| Highland
| 
| 
|-
| Achnasheen
| Highland
| 
| 
|-
| Achosnich
| Highland
| 
| 
|-
| Achreamie
| Highland
| 
| 
|-
| Achriesgill
| Highland
| 
| 
|-
| Achrimsdale
| Highland
| 
| 
|-
| A' Chruach
| Perth and Kinross
| 
| 
|-
| Achtalean
| Highland
| 
| 
|-
| Achterneed
| Highland
| 
| 
|-
| Achtoty
| Highland
| 
| 
|-
| Achurch
| Northamptonshire
| 
| 
|-
| Achuvoldrach
| Highland
| 
| 
|}

Ack-Act

|-
| Ackenthwaite
| Cumbria
| 
| 
|-
| Ackergill
| Highland
| 
| 
|-
| Acklam
| Middlesbrough
| 
| 
|-
| Acklam
| North Yorkshire
| 
| 
|-
| Ackleton
| Shropshire
| 
| 
|-
| Acklington
| Northumberland
| 
| 
|-
| Ackton
| Wakefield
| 
| 
|-
| Ackworth Moor Top
| Wakefield
| 
| 
|-
| Acle
| Norfolk
| 
| 
|-
| Acocks Green
| Birmingham
| 
| 
|-
| Acol
| Kent
| 
| 
|-
| Acomb
| Northumberland
| 
| 
|-
| Acomb
| York
| 
| 
|-
| Acre
| Oldham
| 
| 
|-
| Acrefair
| Wrexham
| 
| 
|-
| Acres Nook
| Staffordshire
| 
| 
|-
| Acton
| Dorset
| 
| 
|-
| Acton
| Shropshire
| 
| 
|-
| Acton
| Worcestershire
| 
| 
|-
| Acton
| Suffolk
| 
| 
|-
| Acton
| Ealing
| 
| 
|-
| Acton
| Wrexham
| 
| 
|-
| Acton
| Staffordshire
| 
| 
|-
| Acton
| Cheshire East
| 
| 
|-
| Acton Beauchamp
| Herefordshire
| 
| 
|-
| Acton Bridge
| Cheshire West and Chester
| 
| 
|-
| Acton Burnell
| Shropshire
| 
| 
|-
| Acton Green
| Herefordshire
| 
| 
|-
| Acton Green
| Ealing
| 
| 
|-
| Acton Pigott
| Shropshire
| 
| 
|-
| Acton Place
| Suffolk
| 
| 
|-
| Acton Reynald
| Shropshire
| 
| 
|-
| Acton Round
| Shropshire
| 
| 
|-
| Acton Scott
| Shropshire
| 
| 
|-
| Acton Trussell
| Staffordshire
| 
| 
|-
| Acton Turville
| South Gloucestershire
| 
| 
|}

Ad

|-
| Adabroc
| Western Isles
| 
| 
|-
| Adambrae
| West Lothian
| 
| 
|-
| Adam's Green
| Dorset
| 
| 
|-
| Adbaston
| Staffordshire
| 
| 
|-
| Adber
| Dorset
| 
| 
|-
| Adbolton
| Nottinghamshire
| 
| 
|-
| Adderbury
| Oxfordshire
| 
| 
|-
| Adderley
| Shropshire
| 
| 
|-
| Adderley Green
| City of Stoke-on-Trent
| 
| 
|-
| Addiewell
| West Lothian
| 
| 
|-
| Addingham
| Bradford
| 
| 
|-
| Addingham Moorside
| Bradford
| 
| 
|-
| Addington
| Cornwall
| 
| 
|-
| Addington
| Buckinghamshire
| 
| 
|-
| Addington
| Croydon
| 
| 
|-
| Addington
| Kent
| 
| 
|-
| Addinston
| Scottish Borders
| 
| 
|-
| Addiscombe
| Croydon
| 
| 
|-
| Addlestone
| Surrey
| 
| 
|-
| Addlestonemoor
| Surrey
| 
| 
|-
| Addlethorpe
| Lincolnshire
| 
| 
|-
| Adel
| Leeds
| 
| 
|-
| Adeney
| Shropshire
| 
| 
|-
| Adeyfield
| Hertfordshire
| 
| 
|-
| Adfa
| Powys
| 
| 
|-
| Adforton
| Herefordshire
| 
| 
|-
| Adgestone
| Isle of Wight
| 
| 
|-
| Adisham
| Kent
| 
| 
|-
| Adlestrop
| Gloucestershire
| 
| 
|-
| Adlingfleet
| East Riding of Yorkshire
| 
| 
|-
| Adlington
| Cheshire East
| 
| 
|-
| Adlington
| Lancashire
| 
| 
|-
| Adlington Park
| Wigan
| 
| 
|-
| Admaston
| Shropshire
| 
| 
|-
| Admaston
| Staffordshire
| 
| 
|-
| Admington
| Warwickshire
| 
| 
|-
| Adpar
| Carmarthenshire
| 
| 
|-
| Adsborough
| Somerset
| 
| 
|-
| Adscombe
| Somerset
| 
| 
|-
| Adstock
| Buckinghamshire
| 
| 
|-
| Adstone
| Northamptonshire
| 
| 
|-
| Adswood
| Stockport
| 
| 
|-
| Adversane
| West Sussex
| 
| 
|-
| Advie
| Highland
| 
| 
|-
| Adwalton
| Leeds
| 
| 
|-
| Adwell
| Oxfordshire
| 
| 
|-
| Adwick le Street
| Doncaster
| 
| 
|-
| Adwick upon Dearne
| Doncaster
| 
| 
|}

Ae

|-
| Ae
| Dumfries and Galloway
| 
| 
|}

Af

|-
| Affetside
| Bolton
| 
| 
|-
| Affleck
| Aberdeenshire
| 
| 
|-
| Affpuddle
| Dorset
| 
| 
|-
| Afon Eitha
| Wrexham
| 
| 
|-
| Afon-wen
| Flintshire
| 
| 
|-
| Afon Wen
| Gwynedd
| 
| 
|-
| Afton
| Isle of Wight
| 
| 
|}

Ag

|-
| Agar Nook
| Leicestershire
| 
| 
|-
| Agbrigg
| Wakefield
| 
| 
|-
| Aggborough
| Worcestershire
| 
| 
|-
| Agglethorpe
| North Yorkshire
| 
| 
|-
| Aglionby
| Cumbria
| 
| 
|-
| Agneash
| Isle of Man
| 
| 
|}

Ai

|-
| Aifft
| Denbighshire
| 
| 
|-
| Aigburth
| Liverpool
| 
| 
|-
| Aike
| East Riding of Yorkshire
| 
| 
|-
| Aiketgate
| Cumbria
| 
| 
|-
| Aikton
| Cumbria
| 
| 
|-
| Ailby
| Lincolnshire
| 
| 
|-
| Ailsa Craig
| South Ayrshire
| 
| 
|-
| Ailstone
| Warwickshire
| 
| 
|-
| Ailsworth
| Cambridgeshire
| 
| 
|-
| Aimes Green
| Essex
| 
| 
|-
| Ainderby Quernhow
| North Yorkshire
| 
| 
|-
| Ainderby Steeple
| North Yorkshire
| 
| 
|-
| Aingers Green
| Essex
| 
| 
|-
| Ainley Top
| Kirklees
| 
| 
|-
| Ainsdale
| Sefton
| 
| 
|-
| Ainstable
| Cumbria
| 
| 
|-
| Ainsworth
| Bury
| 
| 
|-
| Ainthorpe
| North Yorkshire
| 
| 
|-
| Aintree
| Sefton
| 
| 
|-
| Airbles
| North Lanarkshire
| 
| 
|-
| Aird (Lewis)
| Western Isles
| 
| 
|-
| Aird (Benbecula)
| Western Isles
| 
| 
|-
| Aird Adhanais
| Western Isles
| 
| 
|-
| Aird a Mhachair
| Western Isles
| 
| 
|-
| Aird a' Mhulaidh
| Western Isles
| 
| 
|-
| Aird Asaig
| Western Isles
| 
| 
|-
| Aird Brenish
| Western Isles
| 
| 
|-
| Aird Choinnich
| Western Isles
| 
| 
|-
| Aird Dhail
| Western Isles
| 
| 
|-
| Airdens
| Highland
| 
| 
|-
| Aird Mhanais
| Western Isles
| 
| 
|-
| Aird Mhighe (Loch Stocanais)
| Western Isles
| 
| 
|-
| Aird Mhighe (Loch Fhionnsabhaigh)
| Western Isles
| 
| 
|-
| Aird Mhòr
| Western Isles
| 
| 
|-
| Aird na Monadh
| Western Isles
| 
| 
|-
| Aird nan Sruban
| Western Isles
| 
| 
|-
| Aird of Sleat
| Highland
| 
| 
|-
| Airdrie
| North Lanarkshire
| 
| 
|-
| Aird Ruairidh
| Western Isles
| 
| 
|-
| Aird Shleibhe
| Western Isles
| 
| 
|-
| The Aird
| Highland
| 
| 
|-
| Aird Thunga
| Western Isles
| 
| 
|-
| Airdtorrisdale
| Highland
| 
| 
|-
| Aird Uig
| Western Isles
| 
| 
|-
| Airedale
| Wakefield
| 
| 
|-
| Aire View
| North Yorkshire
| 
| 
|-
| Airidh a' Bhruaich
| Western Isles
| 
| 
|-
| Airlie
| Angus
| 
| 
|-
| Airmyn
| East Riding of Yorkshire
| 
| 
|-
| Airntully
| Perth and Kinross
| 
| 
|-
| Airor
| Highland
| 
| 
|-
| Airth
| Falkirk
| 
| 
|-
| Airthrey Castle
| Stirling
| 
| 
|-
| Airton
| North Yorkshire
| 
| 
|-
| Airy Hill
| North Yorkshire
| 
| 
|-
| Aisby (South Kesteven)
| Lincolnshire
| 
| 
|-
| Aisby (West Lindsey)
| Lincolnshire
| 
| 
|-
| Aisgernis
| Western Isles
| 
| 
|-
| Aish (South Brent)
| Devon
| 
| 
|-
| Aish (Stoke Gabriel)
| Devon
| 
| 
|-
| Aisholt
| Somerset
| 
| 
|-
| Aiskew
| North Yorkshire
| 
| 
|-
| Aislaby (Ryedale)
| North Yorkshire
| 
| 
|-
| Aislaby (Scarborough)
| North Yorkshire
| 
| 
|-
| Aislaby
| Stockton-on-Tees
| 
| 
|-
| Aisthorpe
| Lincolnshire
| 
| 
|-
| Aith
| Shetland Islands
| 
| 
|-
| Aithnen
| Powys
| 
| 
|-
| Aithsetter
| Shetland Islands
| 
| 
|}

Ak

|-
| Akeld
| Northumberland
| 
| 
|-
| Akeley
| Buckinghamshire
| 
| 
|-
| Akenham
| Suffolk
| 
| 
|}